Mooney's Bay is an O-Train station along the Trillium Line located near Heron Road and Bronson Avenue in Ottawa, Ontario, which primarily serves the Government of Canada offices in the Confederation Heights area, and students from Brookfield High School. In 2011, a pedestrian and cyclist path was built to provide a direct link between Mooney's Bay Station and Brookfield Road.

The station was originally named Confederation after the area in which the station is located, Confederation Heights. On December 24, 2017, the station was renamed to Mooney's Bay (after nearby Mooney's Bay Park) to avoid confusion with the O-Train's new Confederation Line, which opened in 2019.

Facilities

 Accessibility: Wheelchair accessible with ramp and stairs connecting to Heron Road.
 Washrooms: None
 Nearby: Government of Canada building 501 Heron Road, Sir Leonard Tilley Building, Canada Post, Edward Drake Building, Revenue Canada Data Centre

Service

The following routes serve Mooney's Bay station as of May 3, 2020:

Note: Route  is also available via a walking tunnel at 1500 Bronson, served by bus stops 4091 to Hurdman and 5626 to Lyon.

References

External links

Confederation O-Train station page

Trillium Line stations
Railway stations in Canada opened in 2001
2001 establishments in Ontario